Secret Story - Casa dos Segredos: Desafio Final 2 is the second all-stars season with housemates from Secret Story 3 and 4 of the Portuguese version of the reality show Secret Story, which based on the original French version and of Big Brother. The season started on 5 January 2014 and ended on 2 February 2014. The prize is €15,000. Unlike previous seasons, the live stream is not on MEO, but only available on the official website.

Housemates

Alexandra 
Alexandra Ferreira was a housemate in Secret Story 3 and Desafio Final 1. She entered the house on Day 1.
 Results:
 Secret Story 3: She was the 16th housemate to be evicted from Secret Story 3. She was the 2nd housemate to be evicted in a double eviction against Tatiana, Jean-Mark and Mara, with 34% of the votes to evict.
 Secret Story: Desafio Final 1: She was the female choice from the public, with 9% of the votes to enter. She walked from Secret Story: Desafio Final 1 because she didn't want to continue without Wilson.
 Secret Story: Desafio Final 2: She walked from Secret Story: Desafio Final 2 after seeing an airplane banner sent by her boyfriend urging her to leave.

Cláudio 
Cláudio Viana Fernandes was a housemate in Secret Story 3 and Desafio Final 1. He entered the house on Day 1.
 Results:
 Secret Story 3: He was the 4th Finalist in the Final of Secret Story 3, with 10% of the votes to win.
 Secret Story: Desafio Final 1: He was the 2nd housemate to be evicted from Secret Story: Desafio Final 1. He was the 2nd housemate to be evicted in a double eviction against Susana and Ricardo, with 39% of the votes to evict.
 Secret Story: Desafio Final 2: He was ejected from the house after having unacceptable behavior.

Débora 
Débora Picoito was a housemate in Secret Story 4. She entered the house on Day 8.
 Results:
 Secret Story 4: She was the 9th housemate to be evicted from Secret Story 4. She was evicted against Bernardina and Érica, with 72% of the votes to evict.
 Secret Story: Desafio Final 2: She was the 4th Finalist with 5% of the votes to win.

Érica 
Érica Silva was a housemate in Secret Story 4. She entered the house on Day 1.
 Results:
 Secret Story 4: She was the 4th Finalist in the Final of Secret Story 4, with 8% of the votes to win.
 Secret Story: Desafio Final 2: She was the winner of Secret Story: Desafio Final 2 with 58% of the votes to win.

Fábio 
Fábio Machado was a housemate in Secret Story 3. He entered the house on Day 1.
 Results:
 Secret Story 3: He was the 14th housemate to be evicted from Secret Story 3. He was evicted against Jean-Mark, with 53% of the votes to evict.
 Secret Story: Desafio Final 2: He was the 7th/8th housemate to be evicted along with Mara after losing all challenges to become a finalist.

Jéssica 
Jéssica Gomes was a housemate in Secret Story 3. She entered the house on Day 1.
 Results:
 Secret Story 3: She was the 5th Finalist in the Final of Secret Story 3, with 5% of the votes to win.
 Secret Story: Desafio Final 2: She was the 2nd Finalist with 28% of the votes to win.

Joana 
Joana Diniz was a housemate in Secret Story 4. She entered the house on Day 1.
 Results:
 Secret Story 4: She was the 5th Finalist in the Final of Secret Story 4, with 3% of the votes to win.
 Secret Story: Desafio Final 2: She was the 5th housemate to be evicted from Secret Story: Desafio Final 2. She was the 2nd housemate to be evicted in a double eviction against Rúben B./Tatiana and Tiago, with 26% of the votes to evict.

João 
João Paulo Sousa was a housemate in Secret Story 4. He entered the house on Day 15.
 Results:
 Secret Story 4: He was the 8th housemate to be evicted from Secret Story 4. He was evicted against Bruno and Joana, with 58% of the votes to evict.
 Secret Story: Desafio Final 2: He was the 5th Finalist with 3% of the vote.

Juliana 
Juliana Dias was a housemate in Secret Story 4. She entered the house on Day 1.
 Results:
 Secret Story 4: She was the 5th housemate to be evicted from Secret Story 4. She was evicted against Érica, with 56% of the votes to evict.
 Secret Story: Desafio Final 2: She was the 2nd housemate to be evicted from Secret Story: Desafio Final 2. She was the 1st housemate to be evicted in a double eviction against Joana and Rute, with 42% of the votes to evict.

Lourenço 
Lourenço Cunha was a housemate in Secret Story 4. He entered the house on Day 1.
 Results:
 Secret Story 4: He was the 6th housemate to be evicted from Secret Story 4. He was evicted against Bruno and Rúben, with 70% of the votes to evict.
 Secret Story: Desafio Final 2: He was the 1st housemate to be evicted from Secret Story: Desafio Final 2. He was evicted against Fábio, with 73% of the votes to evict.

Mara 
Mara Spínola was a housemate in Secret Story 3. She entered the house on Day 15.
 Results:
 Secret Story 4: She was the Runner-Up in the Final of Secret Story 3, with 27% of the votes to win.
 Secret Story: Desafio Final 2: She was the 7th/8th housemate to be evicted along with Fabio after losing all challenges to become a finalist.

Rúben B. 
Rúben Boa-Nova was a housemate in Secret Story 3. He entered the house on Day 1.
 Results:
 Secret Story 3: He was the winner in the Final of Secret Story 3, with 35% of the votes to win.
 Secret Story: Desafio Final 2: He was the 4th housemate to be evicted from Secret Story: Desafio Final 2. He was the 1st housemate to be evicted in a double eviction against Joana and Tiago, with 54% of the votes to evict. He was a two-in-one housemate with Tatiana.

Rúben J. 
Rúben J. Nave was a housemate in Secret Story 4. He entered the house on Day 1.
 Results:
 Secret Story 4: He was the 11th housemate to be evicted from Secret Story 4. He was evicted against Diogo, with 61% of the votes to evict.
 Secret Story: Desafio Final 2: He was the 1st housemate to be ejected from the house because he was the housemate with the least credits.

Rute 
Rute Freitas was a housemate in Secret Story 4. She entered the house on Day 1.
 Results:
 Secret Story 4: She was the 3rd housemate to be evicted from Secret Story 4. She was evicted against Diana and Juliana, with 61% of the votes to evict.
 Secret Story: Desafio Final 2: She was the 3rd housemate to be evicted from Secret Story: Desafio Final 2. She was the 2nd housemate to be evicted in a double eviction against Joana and Juliana, with 37% of the votes to evict.

Tatiana 
Tatiana Magalhães was a housemate in Secret Story 3. She entered the house on Day 4.
 Results:
 Secret Story 3: She was the 15th housemate to be evicted from Secret Story 3. She was the 1st housemate to be evicted in a double eviction against Alexandra, Jean-Mark and Mara, with 41% of the votes to evict.
 Secret Story: Desafio Final 2: She was the 4th housemate to be evicted from Secret Story: Desafio Final 2. She was the 1st housemate to be evicted in a double eviction against Joana and Tiago, with 54% of the votes to evict. She was a two-in-one housemate with Rúben B.

Tiago 
Tiago Ginga was a housemate in Secret Story 4. He entered the house on Day 1.
 Results:
 Secret Story 4: He was the 13th housemate to be evicted from Secret Story 4. He was the 2nd housemate to be evicted in a double eviction against Bernardina, Diogo, Érica and Sofia, with 10% of the votes to save.
 Secret Story: Desafio Final 2: He was the 6th housemate to be evicted from Secret Story: Desafio Final 2. He was evicted against Fábio, with 60% of the votes to evict.

Tierry 
Tierry Vilson was a housemate in Secret Story 4. He entered the house on Day 1.
 Results:
 Secret Story 4: He walked from Secret Story 4, one day after Juliana's eviction.
 Secret Story: Desafio Final 2: He was the 3rd Finalist with 6% of the votes to win.

Vanessa 
Vanessa Ferreira was a housemate in Secret Story 3. She entered the house on Day 1.
 Results:
 Secret Story 3: She was the 10th housemate to be evicted from Secret Story 3. She was evicted against Ana, with 50.3% of the votes to evict.
 Secret Story: Desafio Final 2: She was the 2nd housemate ejected from the house for having the least amount of credits after Érica's dilemma.

Secrets 
There are two secrets in the All-Stars season: House's secret and A Voz's secret.

Nominations table

Notes
 : Girls nominate boys in two rounds. It was done face-to-face.
 :  Tierry won immunity, after "A Voz" revealed that the letter "S" was from "safe".
 :  On Monday, the housemates a task. They were divided into 2 teams: A and B. The one that had the most points at the end would win a reward. Team A (Alexandra, Cláudio, Érica, Fábio, Jéssica, Rúben J and Tierry) with 4 points were the winners, won immunity, and they were the only ones that could nominate. They nominated in two rounds, one face-to-face, and another in the Diary Room.
 : There was a tie on the first round between Joana, Juliana and Rute. To break the tie, all members from Team A nominated again. They all nominated the same, exempt Érica, who nominated Rute.
 :  Rúben J. was ejected because he was the housemate with the least credits.
 :  Débora was immune and exempt as new housemate.
 :  The housemates with the bigger number of credits were immune, and were the only ones that could nominate. They nominated in three rounds, all face-to-face. There was a tie on the first round between Tiago and Rúben B./Tatiana. they all nominated the same, exempt Alexandra, who nominated Tatiana. Then, she and Rúben B. are the nominees of the first eviction.
 : Tatiana and Rúben B. could be nominated in separate, but in the end, their nominations were added.
 :  João could enter the house. However, the housemate with the most credits (Érica) has a dilemma. If she chooses to allow João to enter the house, the housemate with the least credits will be ejected. She chooses to do it, and Vanessa (who had the least credits) was ejected from the house.
 :  Tierry won a free pass to the finale for revealing A Voz's secret.
 : The girls nominated the boys. They nominated in three rounds, all face-to-face. There was a tie on the first round between Tiago and Fábio. they all nominated the same, exempt Jéssica, who nominated Tiago. Then, Tiago is the first nominee. There was also a tie on the second round between João and Fábio. they all nominated the same, exempt Érica, who nominated Fábio. Then, Fábio is the second nominee.
 : As Cláudio (who was ejected) was one of the nominees, the eviction still took place, but instead of a double eviction, it was a regular one.
 :  "A Voz" gave the opportunity to the 2 housemates with the most credits win a pass to the finale. It was Érica and Jéssica who had the most credits. There were two boxes with rats. Also in it, there were puzzle pieces. The first to complete the puzzle wins the pass. Jéssica completed first and won the pass to the finale.
 : Housemates competed in serious of challenges to determinate the finalists. In the 1st one, It was the housemates with the most credits (Érica) who would be a finalist. However, to win it, she had to wash 10 dishes in less than 2 minutes. She did it and was the 3rd Finalist. In the 2nd one, the housemate with the most clothes (João) was the 4th Finalist. In the 3rd and final one, the housemate with the ball with access to the final (Débora) would be the 5th Finalist. (See details on Finalists determined)

Nominations total received

Nominations: Results

Twists

Houseguests 
There were some houseguests on this season, most of them are ex-housemates from the house.

Credits 
On Day 10, the housemates with the least credit numbers were ejected by "A Voz". It was Rúben J., with only 4,100 credits. Débora could not be ejected, as she had the initial sale. Also, the Top 5 with the most credits were the ones that nominated.

Fake nominations 
On Day 17, the boys had to fake nominate a girl. There was a tie between Alexandra and Érica. In the tie-breaker, they all nominated the same, exempt João, who nominated Alexandra. Alexandra would be nominated if it was true.

Finalists determined 
On Day 24, various challenges occurred to determinate the 5 finalists of the season. Jéssica and Tierry had already a spot in the finale.

The first challenge was about credits. The housemate with the most credits would have an opportunity to win a spot in the finale. Érica had the most credits and had to wash 10 dishes in less than 2 minutes. She did it and is the 3rd Finalist of the season.

The second challenge was about clothes. The housemates had 2 minutes to wear the maximum of clothes as they can. João had the most clothes in the end and is the 4th Finalist of the season.

The third and final challenge was about balls. The housemates had to take their swimming suits. In the swimming pool, there were 6 balls. Each of them had to take 2 balls. In one of those balls is the access to the final. Débora had the ball with the access to the final and is the 5th and last Finalist of the season.

Mara and Fábio were evicted after losing the challenges.

Fake voting 
On Day 24, after the 1st challenge, housemates were asked to fake chose the 4th Finalist. There was a tie in the end between Fábio, Débora and João. The tie was not broken.

Ratings and Guests

Live Shows

Afternoon Diary 
In this season (at Monday, Wednesday, Thursday and Friday), there is a special live show, were Teresa Guilherme talks a bit with the housemates, and also with special guests in the studio.

References

External links
 Official Website 

Desafio Final 2
2014 Portuguese television seasons